Thomas D. Croci is an American politician and naval officer from the state of New York. A Republican, Croci represented the 3rd District of the New York State Senate from 2015 through 2018. He served as Deputy Assistant Secretary of Defense for Afghanistan, Pakistan, and Central Asia in the Trump administration, from February 3, 2020 to January 19, 2021.

He was elected to his first political office, town supervisor for the Town of Islip, in 2011. Croci was first elected to the State Senate in 2014.

Life and career
Croci graduated from Connetquot High School and received a bachelor's degree from James Madison University in Harrisonburg, Virginia where he earned a Bachelor of Science degree in Political Science.

He graduated from New York Law School in 1997 and then joined the U.S. Navy, where he went to Officer Candidate School in Pensacola, Florida. He spent eight years on active duty and attained the rank of commander in 2013. He served in Afghanistan and was on the staff of the Homeland Security Council under President George W. Bush and also served on the Barack Obama presidential transition team. Croci thereafter returned to active duty as an intelligence officer in Afghanistan, sixteen months into his first term as town supervisor for  Islip, New York; he returned to Islip in 2014.

Croci was formerly an aide to Republican state Senator Lee Zeldin. Croci was elected to New York State Senate for the 3rd district in November 2014, and was elected to a second term. Croci abruptly left the state Senate to rejoin the U.S. Navy in May 2018 without resigning his seat. According to Newsday, Croci's absence threw "a monkey wrench into the day-to-day operations of the State Senate" by depriving Senate Republicans of a governing majority. Croci did not seek re-election in November 2018.

Croci resides in Sayville, New York.

References

|-

Living people
People from Islip (town), New York
James Madison University alumni
New York Law School alumni
New York (state) lawyers
United States Navy officers
Town supervisors in New York (state)
Republican Party New York (state) state senators
21st-century American politicians
Trump administration personnel
United States Department of Defense officials
1972 births